Adejoke Bolanle Ayoola is a Nigerian-American academic and nursing researcher at Calvin University.

Education
Adejoke studied at Obafemi Awolowo University in Ile-Ife, Nigeria, earning BSN and MSN degrees in 1991 and 1998 respectively. She moved to the United States in 2001 to further her education, earning a Ph.D from Michigan State University, East Lansing, Michigan in 2007.

Adejoke was a Robert Wood Johnson Foundation Nurse Faculty Scholar at the Calvin College Department of Nursing (CCDON) in Grand Rapids, Michigan.

Nursing research
Ajoke's work with low-income women from diverse ethnic backgrounds in Grand Rapids was published in the Journal of Midwifery & Women's Health in July 2013. She was also the major contributor in a study published in the American Journal of Obstetrics and Gynecology in 2009 examining the relationship between the time of recognition of pregnancy and birth outcomes, such as premature births, low birth weight, admission to the neonatal intensive care unit, and infant mortality. Her research focuses on promoting women and adolescent reproductive health with the primary aim of reducing poor maternal and child health outcomes. Her research on aspects of reproductive health knowledge and pregnancy planning regarding three residential, ethnically diverse low-income communities were the partnering neighborhoods with CCDON program. The goal of the project was to reduce the risk of unplanned pregnancy and promote early recognition of pregnancy. Her research illustrates the importance of nursing research and the research generation's relevance to sustaining effective nursing practice, especially within the constantly changing American health care system.
Adejoke is a member of the Midwest Nursing Research Society (MNRS) and the CCDON Vice President for Sigma Theta Tau International Honor Society of Nursing, Kappa Epsilon-at-Large.

Academic posts and honours
Fellow of the American Academy of Nursing (2020–present)
Assistant Professor, August 2007–present: Department of Nursing, Calvin College, Grand Rapids
Research Assistant, January 2005–present:  Department of Medicine, Michigan State University.
Senior Nurse Educator, November 2000–August 2003: Post-Basic Nursing School, National Ear Care Center, Lagos, Nigeria.
Program Officer, September 1999–October 2000: Action Health Incorporated, Lagos, Nigeria
Program Officer, June 1998–August 1999: Women Health Promotion Project, Ile-Ife, Nigeria
Graduate Nurse Tutor, April 1994–June 1998: Department of Nursing, Obafemi Awolowo University, Ile-Ife, Osun State, Nigeria
Midwife Tutor, May 1993–January 1994: School of Midwifery, Oluyoro Catholic Hospital, Ibadan, Oyo State, Nigeria.

Selected publications

References

External links

20th-century births
Living people
Yoruba women nurses
Nigerian nurses
Yoruba women academics
Nigerian women academics
American women academics
Nursing researchers
Calvin University faculty
Obafemi Awolowo University alumni
Michigan State University alumni
Nursing educators
African-American nurses
American people of Yoruba descent
Nigerian emigrants to the United States
People from Grand Rapids, Michigan
American nurses
American women nurses
Advanced practice registered nurses
Year of birth missing (living people)
Fellows of the American Academy of Nursing
21st-century African-American people
21st-century African-American women
20th-century African-American people
20th-century African-American women
 Yoruba people